The Holzmaar lies in the Volcanic Eifel in the German state of Rhineland-Palatinate almost halfway between Gillenfeld (2.5 km away to the southwest) and Eckfeld. It is one of the two maars making up the Gillenfeld Maars, the other being the Pulvermaar.

The Holzmaar is fed by a headstream of the Sammetbach which crosses the maar. In the immediate vicinity is another maar, the Dürres Maar.

On its south and southwest shores, the maar has silted up with sediments, core samples from which give a comprehensive picture of the climate going back to the  last cold period. The sediments of the Holzmaar go back 23,200 years. This assessment was made possible by comparing the sequence and radiometric dating obtained in the maar basin with that of the Meerfelder Maar. The time of the maximum of the last glaciation derived from varve chronology is in close agreement with data from the Greenland Ice Sheet Project (GISP2), but are somewhat at odds with those of the Greenland Ice Core Project (GRIP).

In the sequence of sediments three zones of strata were found, when the most dust was deposited in the crater lake. If these dust-laden layers correspond to the ice advances of the northern German inland ice sheet, by comparing them with the exact chronological sequence of the dust layers in the Maar sediments an equally accurate age for local terminal moraines may be possible at suitable locations in northern Germany.

References

Literature 
 Werner D´hein: Natur- und Kulturführer Vulkanlandeifel. Mit 26 Stationen der "Deutschen Vulkanstraße". Gaasterland-Verlag, Düsseldorf. 2006, 
 H. Wolfgang Wagner et al., 2012: Trier und Umgebung, Sammlung geologischer Führer, Bd. 60, 3. Auflage, Bornträger, (see:) http://www.schweizerbart.de/publications/detail/artno/011006040
 Bernd Zolitschka, Paläoklimatische Bedeutung laminierter Sedimente: Holzmaar (Eifel, Deutschland), Lake C2 (Nordwest-Territorien, Kanada) und Lago Grande di Monticchio (Basilicata, Italien). Relief Boden Palaeoklima, Vol. 13, 1998.

External links 

Rezension zum Forschungsbericht Paläoklimatische Bedeutung laminierter Sedimente – Holzmaar (Eifel, Deutschland), Lake C2 (Nordwest-Territorien, Kanada) und Lago Grande di Monticchio (Basilicata, Italien). 1998

Bogs of Rhineland-Palatinate
Maars of the Eifel
Nature reserves in Rhineland-Palatinate
Vulkaneifel